The Pass Island Granite is a formation cropping out in Newfoundland.

References

Geology of Newfoundland and Labrador